This is a list of public art in Perth and Kinross, one of the 32 local government council areas of Scotland. This list applies only to works of public art on permanent display in an outdoor public space and does not, for example, include artworks in museums.

Aberfeldy

Alyth

Auchterarder

Blairgowrie

Crieff

Dunkeld

Invergowrie

Kenmore

Kinross

Longforgan

Milnathort

Muthill

Perth

Pitlochry

Scone

References

Perth and Kinross
Outdoor sculptures in Scotland
Statues in Scotland